Communist Party of India (Marxist–Leninist) Bolshevik was a small communist party in India. It was formed by Jayshree Rana, who broke with her husband's (Santosh Rana) CPI (ML) after they had decided to run in elections in mid 1977.

References

Defunct communist parties in India
Political parties established in 1977
1977 establishments in India
Political parties with year of disestablishment missing